Arfa Khanum Sherwani (born 1 November 1980) is an Indian journalist, and the senior editor of The Wire. She was the only Indian journalist to cover the 2014 Afghan presidential elections. She is an alumna of Chaudhary Charan Singh University, Aligarh Muslim University and Jamia Millia Islamia. She has received the Red Ink Award and the Chameli Devi Jain Award.

Biography
Arfa Khanum Sherwani was born on 1 November 1980 in Bulandshahr, Uttar Pradesh. She completed her intermediate studies in the city and obtained a B.Sc. degree from the Chaudhary Charan Singh University in Meerut. She received a diploma in journalism from the Aligarh Muslim University and completed her doctoral studies at Jamia Millia Islamia.

Arfa started her career in journalism in 2000. She joined The Pioneer as an intern and later worked with The Asian Age and then Sahara TV. She joined NDTV as a principal correspondent and news anchor. She worked with Rajya Sabha TV until 2017 and is a senior editor of The Wire. She was the only Indian journalist to cover the 2014 Afghan presidential elections.

Harassment 
In 2020, a 42 second clip was cut from a speech Sherwani delivered at the Aligarh Muslim University over Citizenship (Amendment) Act, 2019 and given a distorted interpretatioin to harass her. While talking to the Committee to Protect Journalists, she stated that she has received death and rape threats on Facebook, Instagram and Twitter. 

Sherwani was a victim of online abuse through the Bulli Bai app, which listed several prominent Muslim women on a mock auction.

Awards
 Chameli Devi Jain Award for Outstanding Women Mediapersons, 2019.
 Sahitya Samman
 Red Ink Award

References

External links 

 Muslims and media images: An interview with Arfa Khanum Sherwani, Sabrang India, retrieved 2 September 2022

Jamia Millia Islamia alumni
Aligarh Muslim University alumni
Chaudhary Charan Singh University alumni
Indian women journalists
Journalists from Uttar Pradesh
Living people
1980 births
People from Bulandshahr